A monody is either a poem that laments another person's death, or a piece of music sung by one voice with instrumental accompaniment.

Monody may also refer to:
Monody (band), American electronic music group
Monody (album), a 2010 album by Mantler
"Monodie", a composition for organ by Olivier Messaien
"Monody", a 2015 song by TheFatRat
"Monody", a song by the 3rd and the Mortal from the album In This Room
Monody, a 2018 film from Nathaniel Dorsky's Arboretum Cycle